St. Patrick High School is a Catholic high school located in the south end of Thunder Bay, Ontario. It is part of the Thunder Bay Catholic District School Board, and its amenities include a chapel, custom-built music rooms, newly renovated auditorium (as of 2010), two gyms, a fully functional cafeteria, and wheelchair accessibility. The schools offers courses in French immersion. Unlike schools in the public system, students at St. Patrick are required to wear uniforms. Its varsity team is the St. Patrick Saints.

History

Fort William Vocational Colligate institute was constructed in 1931 and later changed its name to Selkirk Collegiate & Vocational Institute in 1957. In 1988 it was bought by the Thunder Bay Catholic District School Board to replace Sacred Heart High School, and its name changed to St. Patrick High School. It is currently located in the building formerly occupied by Selkirk High School of the Lakehead District School Board system.

Saint Patrick is one of the two high schools to have uniforms in Thunder Bay.

See also
List of high schools in Ontario
Education in Thunder Bay, Ontario

External links
 School website

High schools in Thunder Bay
Catholic secondary schools in Ontario
Educational institutions established in 1931
1931 establishments in Ontario